3 Civic Plaza, also referred to as 3 Civic Tower is a mixed-use complex in the Whalley / City Centre neighbourhood of Surrey, British Columbia, Canada, near Surrey City Hall. The building was completed in late 2018.

It consists of luxury residences, a hotel (Autograph Collection), offices, retail and Kwantlen Polytechnic University's fifth campus (KPU Civic Plaza) occupying the first five floors above the open lobby/atrium.

History
The neighbourhood of Whalley / City Centre is home to many of Surrey's skyscrapers, including the redevelopment of Flamingo block. Simon Fraser University is based next to the Central City complex, which was the tallest building in Surrey from 2003 to 2018. More recent projects have overtaken the icon. The hotel opened in the first week of April 2018.

Gallery

See also
List of tallest buildings in Surrey
List of tallest buildings in British Columbia

References

Skyscrapers in Canada
Buildings and structures in Surrey, British Columbia
Buildings and structures completed in 2018
2018 establishments in British Columbia